James Pugh  (born July 1891, date of death unknown) was an English footballer. His regular position was at full back. He was born in Hereford, Herefordshire. He played for Manchester United, Clapton Orient, Coventry City, Luton Town, Brighton & Hove Albion, Hereford United, Bridgend Town, Abertillery and Wrexham.

External links
MUFCInfo.com profile

1891 births
English footballers
Manchester United F.C. players
Leyton Orient F.C. players
Coventry City F.C. players
Luton Town F.C. players
Brighton & Hove Albion F.C. players
Wrexham A.F.C. players
Bridgend Town A.F.C. players
Year of death missing
Association football defenders